San Fernando Cathedral also called the Cathedral of Our Lady of Candelaria and Guadalupe is a cathedral of the Catholic Church located in downtown San Antonio, Texas, United States, facing the city's Main Plaza.  It is the mother church of the Archdiocese of San Antonio and the seat of its archbishop. Its dome serves as the city of San Antonio's cultural and geographical center. The cathedral is also known as the Church of Nuestra Señora de la Candelaria y Guadalupe and is listed on the National Register of Historic Places. It is notable as one of the oldest cathedrals in the United States.

History 

The original church of San Fernando was built between 1738 and 1750. The walls of that church today form the sanctuary of the cathedral, which gives rise to its claim as the oldest cathedral in the State of Texas. The church was named for Ferdinand III of Castile, who ruled in the 13th century. The baptismal font, believed to be a gift from Charles III, who became King of Spain from 1759, is the oldest piece of liturgical furnishing in the cathedral. The cathedral was built by soldiers from the Presidio de San Antonio, their families and settlers from the Canary Islands; for this reason the interior is an image of the Virgin of Candelaria, the patroness of the Canary Islands.

In 1831, James Bowie married Ursula de Veramendi in San Fernando.

In 1836, the cathedral, still a parish church, played a role in the Battle of the Alamo when Mexican General Antonio López de Santa Anna hoisted a flag of "no quarter" from the church's tower, marking the beginning of the siege.

The ashes of the heroes that died defending the Alamo on March 6, 1836, are interred here.

In 1868, under the direction of architect Francois P. Giraud, the cathedral was considerably enlarged in the Gothic style, the addition forming the existing nave. The carved stone Stations of the Cross were added in 1874. The striking stained glass windows were added in 1920.

On September 13, 1987, Pope John Paul II visited the cathedral during the only papal visit to Texas. A marker commemorates the event.

2003: major restoration 
In 2003, a $15 million renovation project was undertaken which involved three phases:
 Phase One – restoration and stabilization of the cathedral foundation and structure and its enhancement for liturgy and other events. The altar was moved outside of the sanctuary, closer to the center of the nave, allegedly "to enhance the experience for Mass" and the baptismal font was relocated from the back of the church into the main aisle, against Catholic custom, which emphasizes that baptism is the entry into the Catholic Church (the baptismal font being placed near the entrance to the church symbolically indicates that).
 Phase Two – replacement of the rectory with a new Cathedral Centre which will house a small cafeteria, counseling rooms, museum, gift shop, reception room, television control room, and vesting sacristy.
 Phase Three – construction of a community centre to house community and social services, meeting rooms, a hall, church offices, and a residence for the priests.

The 2003 renovation was supervised by Richard S. Vosko, a liturgical design consultant and priest of the Diocese of Albany who has overseen often-controversial redesigns and renovations of numerous churches and cathedrals around the country.

Today 

The cathedral remains at the heart of Catholic religious life of San Antonio, and this includes involvement in annual events such as the Fiesta Week. Over 5,000 participate at weekend Masses each week of the year. Over 900 baptisms, 100 weddings, 100 funerals, and countless other services and special events are performed each year, most notably in the staging of the Good Friday Passion Play, which attracts thousands of visitors.

In February 2006, the cathedral began a year-long celebration recognizing San Antonio's 275th Anniversary.

2011: minor renovation 

In 2011, Archbishop Gustavo García-Siller broke from the design envisioned for the cathedral restoration and reversed some prior alterations of Vosko's design which had violated church law, unveiling a new altar permanently affixed to the floor and within the sanctuary; a new traditional bishop's chair or cathedra; relocating the baptismal font from the back of the church back to the front next to the lectern; and installing a new railing behind the altar to section off the sanctuary to prevent people visiting the retablo from straying onto the altar. Donations from parishioners and outside donors in the amount of $150,000 funded the 2011 project. As part of the dedication, the archbishop placed three relics in the altar. Two are relics of St. Anthony of Padua, a Doctor of the Church and the patron saint of San Antonio; and a third relic is of Venerable Concepcion Cabrera de Armida, also known as Conchita, who inspired the formation of the Missionaries of the Holy Spirit (Archbishop Garcia-Siller was ordained a priest to the Missionaries of the Holy Spirit in 1984) as well as 16 other spirituality inspired Catholic organizations.

See also

 List of Catholic cathedrals in the United States
 List of cathedrals in the United States
 San Antonio Missions National Historical Park
 Alamo Mission in San Antonio
 Alamo Plaza Historic District
 Main and Military Plazas Historic District
 List of the oldest churches in the United States

References

External links 

 Official cathedral site
 Roman Catholic Archdiocese of San Antonio
 National Register of Historic Places.com
 
 San Fernando Cathedral at the Handbook of Texas Online

Churches completed in 1731
Fernando
Churches on the National Register of Historic Places in Texas
Roman Catholic churches in San Antonio
National Register of Historic Places in San Antonio
18th-century Roman Catholic church buildings in the United States